The monument to Kosovo heroes in Kruševac is the most famous sculptural work by Đorđe Jovanović about the Battle of Kosovo. The monument is dedicated to the heroes of the Battle of Kosovo and is located on the Square of the Heroes of Kosovo in Kruševac. The monument represents the symbol of Kruševac since the 15th (28). June 1904, when King Petar I Karađorđević inaugurated it on the occasion of the celebration of the centenary of the First Serbian Uprising. The foundation stone was laid by King Aleksandar Obrenović on the occasion of the celebration of the 500th anniversary of the Battle of Kosovo in 1889.

The Appearance of the monument 

The monument is in the form of a marble pyramid, 6 meters high, with a composition of Villa and Boško Jugović on top (4 m). The monument was made in a neoclassical style with clear sculptural symbols.

The most significant is the composition at the top. Boško Jugović, the standard-bearer of the Serbian army, who, on behalf of an entire sacrificed generation, uttered the patriotic oath "I don't think I will come back", fights wounded, with a broken sword, but does not drop the flag. In the dramatic final moments, Willa flies in and accepts the banner, symbolizing the continuation of the fight, and places a laurel wreath on his head.

The figure of the fiddler, on the north side of the monument, represents the duration of the epic struggle through the centuries, and the Girl on the south side symbolizes Serbia, which, with an outstretched hand towards the south, is calling for the liberation of its enslaved brothers, promising a crown of glory to the Pregaos.
The relief on the eastern side depicts the epic communion of the prince's army, and on the western side is the scene of the murder of the Turkish emperor Murat. The numbers on the monument indicate the events: 1389 — the year of the Battle of Kosovo, 1904 — the unveiling of the monument, 1882 — the declaration of Serbia as a kingdom (King Milan Obrenović).

A representation of the Serbian coats of arms also found a place on the monument: the eastern side — the coat of arms of Prince Lazar and the dedication "Serbia to the Heroes of Kosovo", on the north side the coat of arms of Nemanjić, and on the south side the new coat of arms of the Kingdom of Serbia.

Kosovar Heroes' Square was renovated on the occasion of the 600th anniversary of the founding of the city (in 1971), and it got its present appearance fifty years later (in 2021) on the occasion of the 650th anniversary of the founding of the city.

In honor of the celebration of the 600th anniversary of the Battle of Kosovo, in 1989, there is a gilded wreath placed on the head of Boško Jugović by the villa.

The monument was damaged in 2000 during protests against election theft that were daily until October 5. Demonstrators knocked the bow out of the hands of Filip Višnjić. A new bow was cast and returned to the poet's hands after a few years.

See also
Cultural Monuments of Rasina District

References

Kruševac
Monuments and memorials in Serbia